Mayors of the Boston Staple, Lincolnshire, England:

1375-76 and 1384-85: John Sutton of Lincoln
1379-80:Robert Sutton
1389-1390: William Dalderby
1390-1391: Robert Ledes

References

Boston
Lincolnshire-related lists
Boston, Lincolnshire
Boston Staple